The Queensland Guineas is a Brisbane Racing Club Group 2 Thoroughbred horse race held over 1600 metres, at set weights, for three-year-old horses held at Eagle Farm Racecourse in Brisbane, Australia in June during the Queensland Winter Racing Carnival. Total prizemoney is A$350,000.

Due to track reconstruction of Eagle Farm Racecourse for the 2014–15 racing season the event was transferred to Doomben Racecourse.

History

Prior to 2005 the race was held in early May. From 2006 to 2008 the race was held on the Queen's Birthday holiday in June. Since 2009 it is held in early June.

Grade
1896–1978 - Principal race
1979–1987 -  Group 3
1988 onwards - Group 2 race

Distance
1896–1972 - 1 mile
1973–2011 – 1600 metres
2012–2014 – 1400 metres
2015 – 1600 metres

Venue
2017 Doomben Racecourse
2018 Doomben Racecourse

Winners

 2022 - Character
 2021 - Private Eye
 2020 - ‡race not held
 2019 - Kolding
 2018 - Sambro
 2017 - Salsonic
 2016 - Tsaritsa
 2015 - Jabali
 2014 - Sir Moments
 2013 - Sizzling
 2012 - Pear Tart
 2011 - Torio's Quest
 2010 - Rothesay
 2009 - Express Air
 2008 - Turffontein
 2007 - Sequential Charm
 2006 - Nova Star
 2005 - Saxon
 2004 - Winning Belle
 2003 - True Glo
 2002 - Regent Street
 2001 - Heroism
 2000 - Magnifier
 1999 - Camarena
 1998 - Insecure
 1997 - Yippyio
 1996 - race not held
 1995 - Turridu
 1994 - Paris Lane
 1993 - Cuidado
 1992 - Coolong Road
 1991 - Trisca
 1990 - Solar Circle
 1989 - Cole Diesel
 1988 - Planet Ruler
 1987 - Magic Flute
 1986 - Persian World
 1985 - Phoenix Rising
 1984 - Vite Cheval
 1983 - race not held
 1982 - Star Of The Knight
 1981 - Bermuda Bird
 1980 - Cloud Pink
 1979 - Zephyr Zip
 1978 - He'll Do
 1977 - Bay Duke
 1976 - Night Charmer
 1975 - Gentle Jim
 1974 - Spinnelli
 1973 - Dalrello
 1972 - Beau Cera
 1971 - Charlton Boy
 1970 - Waminda
 1969 - Paola Pisani
 1968 - Flying Ace
 1967 - Dual Control
 1966 - Lord Kearsey
 1965 - Maybe Lad
 1964 - Rocky Court
 1963 - Confidence
 1962 - Persian King
 1961 - Ivanhoe
 1960 - Royal Bore
 1959 - Countwood
 1958 - Earlwood
 1957 - Neptunist
 1956 - Book Link
 1955 - Aboukir
 1954 - Cool Gent
 1953 - Kev Mar
 1952 - Kashmir
 1951 - Friar's Frolic
 1950 - Coniston
 1949 - Mr. Sunray
 1948 - Blue Slipper
 1947 - Sefiona
 1946 - Maytown
1942–45 - race not held
 1941 - Felt Yet
 1940 - Bold Step
 1939 - Spearace
 1938 - Seven Fifty
 1937 - Spear Chief
 1936 - Brownfelt
 1935 - Auto Buz
 1934 - Pandion
 1933 - Soft Step
 1932 - Some Cure
 1931 - Lough Neagh
 1930 - Irish Smile
 1929 - Bernfield
 1928 - Hourly
 1927 - High Syce
 1926 - Chryso
 1925 - Taupo
 1924 - Mountain Song
 1923 - Ardglen
 1922 - Kingslot
 1921 - Ladomond
 1920 - Syceonelle
 1919 - Eudor Furly
 1918 - Molly's Robe
 1917 - Master Warkon
 1916 - Lord Acre
 1915 - Irish Colleen
 1914 - Delinacre
 1913 - Lord Burnside
 1912 - Koatanui
 1911 - Yeena Lad
 1910 - Havocorn
 1909 - Mischief
 1908 - Flaxen
 1907 - Euroa
 1906 - Headlight
 1905 - Alexis
 1904 - Joyance
 1903 - Fitz Grafton
 1902 - Balfour
 1901 - Grattan
 1900 - Araxes
 1899 - Lauri
 1898 - Boreas II
 1897 - Boscobel
 1896 - College Cap

‡ Not held because of the COVID-19 pandemic in Australia

See also
 List of Australian Group races
 Group races

References

Horse races in Australia
Sport in Brisbane